1848 Delvaux is a stony Koronis asteroid from the outer region of the asteroid belt, approximately 17 kilometers in diameter. It was discovered on 18 August 1933, by Belgian astronomer Eugène Delporte at the Royal Observatory of Belgium in Uccle, Belgium. It was later named after astronomer Georges Roland's sister-in-law.

Orbit and classification 

Delvaux is a stony asteroid and a member of the Koronis family, a collisional group consisting of a few hundred known bodies with nearly ecliptical orbits. It orbits the Sun in the outer main-belt at a distance of 2.7–3.0 AU once every 4 years and 10 months (1,777 days). Its orbit has an eccentricity of 0.05 and an inclination of 1° with respect to the ecliptic.

Physical characteristics 

In the SMASS taxonomy Delvaux is a common S-type asteroid.

Rotation period 

It has a well-determined rotation period of 3.63 to 3.65 hours with a brightness variation of 0.57–0.69 magnitude. The Collaborative Asteroid Lightcurve Link (CALL) adopts a period of 3.637 hours.

Diameter and albedo 

According to the surveys carried out by the Japanese Akari satellite and NASA's Wide-field Infrared Survey Explorer with its subsequent NEOWISE mission, Delvaux measures between 16.66 and 17.51 kilometers in diameter, and its surface has an albedo of 0.233 to 0.461. CALL assumes a standard albedo for members of the Koronis family of 0.24, and calculates a diameter of 17.12 kilometers with an absolute magnitude of 11.0.

Name 

This minor planet was named after the sister-in-law of Georges Roland, astronomer at the observatory in Uccle and known as the co-discoverer of the comet Arend–Roland. The approved naming citation was published by the Minor Planet Center on 8 April 1982.

References

External links 
 Asteroid Lightcurve Database (LCDB), query form (info )
 Dictionary of Minor Planet Names, Google books
 Asteroids and comets rotation curves, CdR – Observatoire de Genève, Raoul Behrend
 Discovery Circumstances: Numbered Minor Planets (1)-(5000) – Minor Planet Center
 
 

001848
Discoveries by Eugène Joseph Delporte
Named minor planets
001848
19330818